Christian Sahli (6 March 1825, in Meikirch – 27 March 1897) was a Swiss politician and President of the Swiss Council of States (1866/1867 and 1880/1881).

External links 

1825 births
1897 deaths
People from Bern-Mittelland District
Swiss Calvinist and Reformed Christians
Free Democratic Party of Switzerland politicians
Members of the National Council (Switzerland)
Members of the Council of States (Switzerland)
Presidents of the Council of States (Switzerland)